Women as Lovers (Die Liebhaberinnen, published 1975) is a novel by Austrian Nobel laureate Elfriede Jelinek that details the lives of the characters Brigitte and Paula, as the two women transition from dreams of the future, to life with a husband and children. In the novel, Brigitte succeeds in "snagging the social and economic commodity Heinz, which directly results in an upgrading of her socioeconomic status." But she pays for it with her body and the loss of her private autonomy. Paula's existence, on the other hand, is "destroyed by her belief in the illusion of love."

Xiu Xiu's 2008 Women as Lovers is named after the novel.

Characters
 Brigitte
 Heinz
 Paula
 Erich
 Susi

References

1975 novels
Novels by Elfriede Jelinek
Rowohlt Verlag books